The Chinese Rhenish Church Hong Kong Synod is a Lutheran denomination in Hong Kong. It is a member of the Lutheran World Federation, which it joined in 1974. It is affiliated with the Hong Kong Lutheran Federation Ltd.

See also 
Lutheran Church of China

External links 
Official website
Incorporation ordinance
Lutheran World Federation listing

Lutheran denominations
Lutheran organizations
Lutheranism in China
China
Lutheran World Federation members
Protestant churches in Hong Kong